"Lady Bump" is a pop disco song by Austrian singer Penny McLean, released in 1975. It was a hit for McLean, who was formerly with Silver Convention.

About the single
The single backed with "The Lady Bumps On" was released on the Jupiter record label cat - 16 069 AT in June 1975.

The single reached the three million mark. For its popularity in New York discos, the track backed with "The Lady Bumps On" was rated number 14 by November 1975. In January 1976, it debuted on the Cashbox pop singles charts, peaking at number 61. In July 1976, "Lady Bump" rated number 7 in Australia's 2S Music Survey.

Charts

Weekly charts

Year-end charts

Certifications

Other versions
In 1976, a group called January covered the song backed with a version of "Fly, Robin, Fly". Also in the same year,  Czechoslovak singer Skupina Pavla Lišky released it as "Hrej Mi Bump" bw "Daimonion".
A version of the song b with "Hallelujah Day" was recorded by an Italian singer using the name of Betty McNolan and there were some similarities in the presentation of the single as well. 
In 1977, Eiri Thrasher recorded it as well. It was released on the single, "Turn The Beat Around", "Lady Bump" / "Hey Girls Gather Round".
The Italian singer and actress Loretta Goggi, covered the song with Italian lyrics with the title Ma chi sei in 1975.
Later versions have been recorded by Lina Hedlund. It has also been performed by comedy duo Kath & Kim.

References

1975 singles
1976 singles
1975 songs
Disco songs
Penny McLean songs
Songs with music by Sylvester Levay
Songs with lyrics by Michael Kunze